George Ruge may refer to:

 George H. Ruge (1921–2011), American radio broadcaster
 George Marshall Ruge, American film director, actor and writer